The Lithuanian Public Employment Service, called Lithuanian Labour Exchange, is a Lithuanian government agency organized under the Ministry of Social Security and Labour mainly responsible for the public employment service in Lithuania and the implementation labour market policies. The agency should help facilitate meetings and bring together employers with job seekers, especially those who are long-term unemployed and have particular difficulties in finding work. In addition to this, the agency should work to increase employment in the long term. This is primarily done by giving active support to companies in the recruitment process, facilitating meetings at the premises of the Lithuanian Labour Exchange and the use of a searchable, free vacancy database.

See also 
Ministry of Social Security and Labour (Lithuania)

References

External links
Official website of Lithuanian Labour Exchange

Public employment service
Government agencies of Lithuania